Annie Thurman (born November 14, 1996) is an American actress known for playing Sophie Barliss in the TNT drama Proof and Shelly Jessop in the 2013 science fiction horror film Dark Skies.

Life and career
Thurman had originally auditioned for the role of Clove in The Hunger Games, but ultimately lost the role to Isabelle Fuhrman. She appeared as District 9 female Tribute.

In Proof, she has a recurring role as Sophie Barliss, the daughter of Dr. Carolyn "Cat" Tyler, played by Jennifer Beals.
 
She is the face of national commercials including Oscar Mayer and Little Debbie Snacks. She studied acting at workshops, where she was scouted by her current manager and agent. Thurman is an avid animal lover and has two rabbits, two dogs, and four cats. Thurman's hobbies include playing the ukulele, volleyball, and riding horses.

Filmography

References

External links
 
  

1996 births
21st-century American actresses
Actresses from Nashville, Tennessee
American child actresses
American film actresses
Living people